The Aramov Clan are the titular family of fictitious smugglers and bandits of Robert Muchamore's Aramov series. The clan is based in the remote Kyrgyzstan, with their base, known as 'The Kremlin' situated on the outskirts of Bishkek. The Kremlin is located in a steep rigged valley, to prevent being detected by radar. The clan is dismantled at the end of Black Friday.

Clan family tree

Clan members

Lev Aramov
Lev was the head of the clan until his death. He created strong ties with the Soviet Air Force. When the USSR went bankrupt in the 1990s, he purchased cargo planes at very cheap prices. With these planes he started the family's illegal enterprise.

Irena Aramov
Irena is Lev's wife. When Lev died, she became head of the clan. After an attempt on her life by Leonid, she makes a deal with the TFU to hand over the clan in order to get expensive cancer treatment in the United States. She dies of cancer in the events following Black Friday.

Josef Aramov
Josef is the eldest son of Irena and Lev. After the TFU takes over the Aramov Clan, he also makes a deal to guarantee immunity from prosecution. Within this deal he is made a figurehead for the TFU's campaign to wind down operations and destroy all their smuggling equipment. Amy Collins, former CHERUB agent and active TFU agent, plays the role of his girlfriend in the TFU's crushing of the Aramov Clan.

Leonid Aramov
Leonid is the second son of Irena and Lev. He is second in command of the Aramov Clan, after his mother, as his elder brother, Josef, was thought to be weak. His character is described as short tempered and very aggressive. After trying to murder his mother he was kicked out of the clan along with his sons, Boris and Alex.

Galenka Aramov
Galenka is the daughter of Irena and Lev. She split from the clan and changed her name to 'Gillian Kitsell' to study mathematics in the USA. After gaining a degree, she founded a computer-based company in Silicon Valley. As she was homosexual, she gave birth to her son Ethan with a sperm donor. CHERUB, along with TFU, target her and her son to try to break apart the Aramov Clan's Operations. Galenka is killed by a squad of professional hitmen sent by Leonid.

Tamara Aramov
Ex-wife of Leonid and mother of Andre. She was threatened by Leonid after the divorce and stayed to look after Andre once Leonid had been kicked out of the Kremlin. She offered to help the TFU track down Leonid. She and her son Andre were taken by Leonid to Mexico. She eventually shot him dead in the bathroom of their villa before escaping with her son and James Adams. She and her son went to Russia, where she now works in a jewellery store owned by her uncle.

Ethan Aramov
Ethan is Galenka's only son. He is befriended by CHERUB agent Ryan Sharma in the TFU operation. When his mother is assassinated, the assassins mistakenly kill Ethan's best friend, thinking he is Ethan. He escapes, and after his mother is killed, he goes into protective custody with Ted Brasker, a TFU agent. He then helps the operation in questioning Paolo Lombardi and finding that his mother worked with Jane Oxford.

Andre Aramov
Andre is the son of Tamara and Leonid. He lives in the Kremlin and attends the same school as Natalka and Ryan. He trains for the mission to find and take down Leonid with James Adams on the CHERUB campus. After seeing his mother kill Leonid, they emigrate to Russia, where he attends a fee-paying school.

Boris Aramov
Boris is the oldest son of Leonid and his unnamed first wife. He is kicked out of the Kremlin with his brother, Alex, and his father after the attempted murder of his grandmother by Leonid, before escaping to Mexico. After the death of his father, he and his brother move to Trinidad, where Boris is arrested for savagely beating a French tourist.

Alex Aramov
Alex is the second son of Leonid and his unnamed first wife. He was kicked out of the Kremlin with his brother, Boris and his father after the attempted murder of his grandmother by Leonid, before escaping to Mexico. After the death of his father, he and his brother move to Trinidad, where Alex is arrested when the police found steroids and other illegal drugs stashed in their apartment. He is not prosecuted, although he is deported back to Kyrgyzstan.

Notes

References

External links

CHERUB characters